Aiso (written: 相曽) is a Japanese surname. Notable people with the surname include:

, Japanese musician
John F. Aiso (1909–1987), American lawyer and judge

Japanese-language surnames